The 2014 Australian Open wildcard playoffs and entries are a group of events and internal selections to choose the eight men and women wildcard entries for the 2014 Australian Open. Tennis Australia awards eight wildcards each for the men's and women's professional singles and doubles competitions.

Four wildcards each were awarded by internal selection to Australian players. Also, one wildcard each was given to the winners of the Australian Wildcard Playoff, a tournament between Australian players who did not receive direct entry into the draw. Jordan Thompson and Casey Dellacqua were the winners of this tournament.

In an agreement with the United States Tennis Association and the French Tennis Federation, Tennis Australia gives one man and one woman from the United States and France each a wildcard into the Australian Open. The French players were chosen by internal selection, while another playoff, held 20 to 22 December 2013, determined the two US-American players receiving wildcards.

Since the Australian Open are promoted as the "Grand Slam of Asia/Pacific", one male and one female player from this geographical area were awarded a wildcard. This was decided through the Asia Pacific Australian Open Wildcard Playoff with Wu Di and Tang Haochen, both from China, winning the tournament. At the same event, one male and one female doubles team won wildcards (results see below), and one wildcard each was contested in boys and girls singles, with Sun Fajing and Zheng Wushuang winning the tournament respectively.

Wildcard entries
These are the wildcard qualifiers, from both internal selections and playoffs.

Men's singles

Women's singles

Men's doubles

Women's doubles

Asia-Pacific Wildcard Playoff

Men's singles

Women's singles

Men's doubles

Women's doubles

Australian Wildcard Playoff
The Australian Wildcard Playoff took place from Tuesday, December 9, to Sunday, December 15, 2013.

Men's singles

Women's singles

US Wildcard Playoff

Men's singles

Women's singles

References